Thermal power plant Kolubara is a coal-fired plant in central Serbia located in a village Veliki Crljeni ca.  southeast of Belgrade. Operations in it has been started in 1956. Capacity of installed generators reaches 270MW.

Thermal power plant (TPP) Kolubara is one of three TPP's operated by the Electric Power Industry of Serbia (EPS) through the company MB "Kolubara", plc (in Serbian: RB „Kolubara“d.o.o.) in the Kolubara coal basin. Next to it there are power plants Nikola Tesla A & B, as well as Morava. All three power plants are using the lignite from the local basin as their fuel. This lignite is mined in four mines. Electricity production of this location reaches 52% of Serbian yearly energy consumption.

References 

 http://www.industcards.com/st-coal-serbia.htm
 http://www.rbkolubara.rs/index.php?option=com_content&view=article&id=83&Itemid=189&lang=en 
 http://www.eps.rs/Eng/Article.aspx?lista=Sitemap&id=69*
 

Coal-fired power stations in Serbia